Lee Jared Fixel is an American venture capitalist and investor.

Early life and education
Fixel was born in 1980 and was raised near Fort Lauderdale, Florida. He is the eldest of three children and has two younger sisters.

Fixel earned a Bachelor of Science in business administration, finance, and accounting at the Olin Business School at Washington University in St. Louis.

Career

After graduation, Fixel became a licensed chartered financial analyst and began his career at Alkeon Capital Management, an investment firm.

In 2006, Fixel joined Tiger Global Management, a New York-based investment firm. He became a partner and head of the firm's private equity business, before his resignation in March 2019. In a letter received by Reuters in March 2019, Fixel said he planned to continue investing independently. He remains on the board of some portfolio companies, such as Warby Parker. He has also served on the board of Peloton. Among his most notable portfolio investments are Stripe, Peloton, Freshworks, and Spotify, as well as late-stage investments, including Facebook.

Fixel has invested in a number of Indian startups, most famously e-commerce company Flipkart, where he is a member of the board of directors, since 2009.

As of 2018, he has appeared on Forbes Midas List six times over the course of his career.

In 2020, Fixel launched the venture capital firm Addition and raised $1.3 billion to invest in early- and growth-stage startup companies.

Philanthropy 

Fixel, along with his wife, Lauren Fixel, co-founded the Lauren and Lee Fixel Family Foundation. Together, the Fixels are one of the largest contributors to The Michael J. Fox Foundation, a non-profit organization dedicated to Parkinson's disease research.

In January 2019, the Lauren and Lee Fixel Family Foundation donated $20 million to the University of Florida and UF Health to establish the Norman Fixel Institute for Neurological Diseases. The institute is focused on advancing research, technology, and clinical care for Parkinson's and other neurodegenerative diseases such as Alzheimer's disease and Amyotrophic lateral sclerosis (ALS).

References

Living people
21st-century American businesspeople
Olin Business School (Washington University) alumni
1980 births
American venture capitalists
CFA charterholders
People from Florida
American philanthropists
Midas List